Admiral William Compton, 4th Marquess of Northampton,  (20 August 1818 – 11 September 1897), known as Lord William Compton from 1828 to 1877, was a British peer and Royal Navy officer.

Biography 
Northampton was born at York Place, Marylebone, London, the second son of Spencer Joshua Alwyne Compton, 2nd Marquess of Northampton, and his wife Margaret (née Douglas-Maclean-Clephane).

He entered in the Royal Navy in 1831, served during the First Opium War He retired from the active list in 1856 as captain. He was subsequently promoted rear admiral in 1869, and admiral in 1880 on the retired list.

In 1877 he succeeded his elder brother in the marquessate and entered the House of Lords. Northampton was honoured on 9July 1885 when he was made a Knight of the Garter.
He assumed in 1851 by Royal licence the additional surname of Maclean and in 1878 upon succeeding to the titles that of Douglas.

In 1894 he donated the lands in Northampton Square (Clerkenwell, central London) for Northampton Institute (so named in his honour), now City, University of London.

Family
Lord Northampton married Eliza Harriet, daughter of Admiral the Hon. Sir George Elliot, on 21 August 1844 in Naples, Italy. As a result of her marriage, Eliza Elliot was styled as Marchioness of Northampton on 3 March 1877. Together they had five daughters and three sons.  She died aged 72 on 4 December 1877 in Florence, Italy.

Children of Admiral William Compton, 4th Marquess of Northampton & his wife Eliza Harriet née Elliot
 Lady Katrine Cecilia Compton b: 1845 d. 23 Mar 1913 
 Lady Margaret Georgiana Compton b: 1847 d. 15 Nov 1931
 Charles John Spencer Compton, Earl Compton b. 13 Jul 1849, d. 5 Sep 1887 
 William George Spencer Scott Compton, 5th Marquess of Northampton b. 23 Apr 1851, d. 15 Jun 1913 
 Lady Alice Elizabeth Compton b: 1854 d. 17 Jun 1862
 Lord Alwyne Frederick Compton b. 5 Jun 1855, d. 16 Dec 1911
 Lady Mabel Violet Isabel Compton b. c 1862, d. 16 Aug 1961
 Colonel Lord Douglas James Cecil Compton b. 15 Nov 1865, d. 23 Jul 1944

Their eldest daughter, Katrine, married Francis Cowper, 7th Earl Cowper.

Their eldest son Charles John Spencer Compton, Earl Compton, died in 1887, without heirs. Lord Northampton survived his wife by twenty years and died on 11September 1897, aged 78. Just prior to his death, Compton purchased a country house in the village of Tysoe in Warwickshire. He was succeeded in his titles by his second son William.

See also

Notes

References
Kidd, Charles, Williamson, David (editors). Debrett's Peerage and Baronetage (1990 edition). New York: St Martin's Press, 1990, 

1818 births
1897 deaths
Knights of the Garter
William
Royal Navy admirals
Marquesses of Northampton (1812 creation)